Christa may refer to:

 Christa (given name), a female given name
 Janusz Christa (1934-2008), Polish comics author
 Swedish Fly Girls, a 1971 film also known as Christa
 1015 Christa, an asteroid

See also
 Christ (disambiguation)
 Christa-Elizabeth
 Christe
 Christi
 Christo (disambiguation)
 Christy (disambiguation)
 Crista
 Christia
 Krista